Lewis Cotlow (born February 5, 1898 – died 1987) was an American explorer, writer, filmmaker, and fellow of the Royal Geographical Society.

Biography 
Cotlow served in the US Army during World War I and became a supercargo with the United States Merchant Marine.

He studied at New York University. 
Cotlow served in the naval intelligence USA during World II.

After attending George Washington University he made more than 30 expeditions travelled to Africa, South America, Indonesia, and the Arctic, the Amazon, Australia, and New Guinea from 1930s - 1950s to film. His first technicolor movie was filmed on location in Africa and was co-produced with a man called Armand Dennis (a wildlife photographer)

In his lifetime, he was awarded the Explorers Club Medal and Order of Magellan and was a member of The Explorers Club. He was also employed as a New York insurance broker.

He left his collections to Cincinnati Museum of Natural History.

Major works

Books
Passport to Adventure (1942)
Amazon Head-Hunters (1953)
Zanzabuku: Dangerous Safari (book and film, 1956)
In Search of the Primitive: An Independent Explorer's Life with the Last of the Exotic Peoples of Africa, the Arctic, New Guinea (1966)
Twilight of the Primitive (1971)

Films
Through Africa Unarmed (c. 1937; lost)
Upper Amazon and High Andes Adventure (1941)
Savage Splendor (1949)
Jungle Headhunters (1949)
Zanzabuku: Dangerous Safari (book and film, 1956)
High Arctic (film, 1963)

References

External links
 
 Death of Lewis Nathaniel Cotlow // Geni
 Virtual Voyages: Cinema and Travel — p. 216.
 Lewis Cotlow Books // «Shakari Connection»

1898 births
1987 deaths
American explorers
Jewish explorers
American Jews
American film directors
George Washington University alumni
American male writers
American people of World War I
American people of World War II
American spies
New York University alumni
Fellows of the Royal Geographical Society